Lilium pardalinum, also known as the leopard lily or panther lily, is a flowering bulbous perennial plant in the lily family, native to Oregon, California, and Baja California. It usually grows in damp areas. Its range includes California chaparral and woodlands habitats and the Sierra Nevada.

The bulbs are small, and many are usually clustered together on a rhizomatous stock. The flowers are Turk's-cap shaped, red-orange, with numerous brown spots, usually flowering in July.

Subspecies
Lilium pardalinum subsp. pardalinum Kellogg -- leopard lily - southern California, Baja California
Lilium pardalinum subsp. pitkinense (Beane & Vollmer) Skinner -- Pitkin Marsh lily - northwestern California
Lilium pardalinum subsp. shastense (Eastw.) Skinner -- Shasta lily - Oregon, northern California
Lilium pardalinum subsp. vollmeri (Eastw.) Skinner -- Vollmer's lily - southwestern Oregon, northwestern California
Lilium pardalinum subsp. wigginsii (Beane & Vollmer) Skinner -- Wiggins' lily - southwestern Oregon, northwestern California

The subspecies Pitkin Marsh lily, Lilium pardalinum subsp. pitkinense, is federally listed as an endangered species.

Cultivation
Lilium pardalinum is cultivated by specialty plant nurseries as an ornamental plant, for use in native plant gardens and wildlife gardening; as well as providing height and colour in the flower border and for cut flowers. It has gained the Royal Horticultural Society's Award of Garden Merit.

References

External links

Jepson Manual Treatment: Lilium pardalinum
USDA Plants Profile: Lilium pardalinum (leopard lily)
Labs1.eol.org

pardalinum
Flora of California
Flora of Oregon
Flora of the Cascade Range
Flora of the Great Basin
Flora of the Klamath Mountains
Flora of the Sierra Nevada (United States)
Natural history of the California chaparral and woodlands
Natural history of the California Coast Ranges
Natural history of the Central Valley (California)
Natural history of the Channel Islands of California
Natural history of the Peninsular Ranges
Natural history of the San Francisco Bay Area
Natural history of the Santa Monica Mountains
Natural history of the Transverse Ranges
Garden plants of North America
Flora without expected TNC conservation status